North Ayrshire is one of 32 council areas in Scotland. The council area borders Inverclyde to the north, Renfrewshire and East Renfrewshire to the northeast, and East Ayrshire and South Ayrshire to the east and south respectively. The local authority is North Ayrshire Council, formed in 1996 with the same boundaries as the district of Cunninghame which existed from 1975 to 1996.

Located in the west central Lowlands with the Firth of Clyde to its west, the council area covers the northern portion of the historic county of Ayrshire, in addition to the islands of Arran and The Cumbraes from the historic county of Buteshire. North Ayrshire has a population of roughly  people. The largest settlements are Irvine and Kilwinning.

History
North Ayrshire was created in 1996 under the Local Government etc. (Scotland) Act 1994, which replaced Scotland's previous local government structure of upper-tier regions and lower-tier districts with unitary council areas providing all local government services. North Ayrshire covered the same area as the abolished Cunninghame district, and also took over the functions of the abolished Strathclyde Regional Council within the area. The area's name references its location within the historic county of Ayrshire, which had been abolished for local government purposes in 1975 when Cunninghame district and Strathclyde region had been created, although the islands of Arran and The Cumbraes had been in Buteshire prior to 1975. North Ayrshire forms part of the Ayrshire and Arran lieutenancy area.

Geography
The council headquarters are located in Irvine, which is the largest town. The area also contains the towns of Ardrossan, Beith, Dalry, Kilbirnie, Kilwinning, Largs, Saltcoats, Skelmorlie, Stevenston, West Kilbride, as well as the Isle of Arran and Great and Little Cumbrae. The Isle of Arran covers nearly half of the council area's territory, but is home to less than 4% of the population. North Ayrshire is known for its rural countryside, coastlines, beaches and landmarks.

The towns in the north of the area, Skelmorlie, Largs, Fairlie and West Kilbride are affluent commuting towns and with them being on the coast, are very popular with tourists during the summer months. Towns in the south include Ardrossan, Saltcoats and Stevenston. Towards the south of the area is Kilwinning and Irvine, the main settlement and largest town in the area. The inland towns of Dalry, Kilbirnie and Beith were steel towns with large steel mills, but these are long gone. Tourism is the main industry on Arran and Cumbrae; however, the number of holiday homes on the latter has begun to squeeze locals out of the housing market. Regeneration is currently taking place at Ardrossan Harbour and Irvine town centre, and there has been a rapid increase in the construction of new housing in recent years.

Kelburn Castle, Fairlie, is the home of the 10th Earl of Glasgow, Patrick Robin Archibald Boyle. The grounds have belonged to the Boyle family since the 1100s. In 2007, the castle was transformed by the Graffiti Project.

Economy

North Ayrshire has a slightly higher level of unemployment compared to the Scottish average. North Ayrshire launched an Economic Recovery and Renewal Strategy in September 2020 focusing on economic recovery and a renewal approach which aims to sets out a comprehensive plan for an inclusive and green economic recovery for North Ayrshire. An £8.8 million Investment Fund will be used as a key element of a Green New Deal by:

 Maximising renewable energy generation using the council's land and assets.
 The creation of a new Green Jobs Fund to ensure a just transition for North Ayrshire.
 Investing in commercial estate including improving sustainability.
 Tackling vacant and derelict land and buildings in town centres.
 Supporting community economic development including through community regeneration and ownership.
 A tree-planting programme to support carbon absorption.

In May 2020, North Ayrshire Council became the first council in Scotland to become a Community Wealth Building (CWB) Council, setting out a new economic model focused on wellbeing and inclusion. North Ayrshire Council seeks to use Community Wealth Building objectives to support the recovery and renewal of North Ayrshire by creating an economy that works for people, place and planet.

The North Ayrshire approach will see the creation of a new £660,000 Community Wealth Building Business Fund to provide assistance to local business and facilitating the development of co-operatives, employee ownership and social enterprises, supporting local supply chains, fair employment, digital adoption and the transition to a green economy. North Ayrshire is to benefit from the Ayrshire Growth Deal, an economic plan created by both the Scottish Government and UK Government. The £250 million Ayrshire Growth Deal is also central to the plans to support economic recovery through a bold and ambitious investment programme to create and secure jobs within the area of North Ayrshire.

Governance

 
The council has been under no overall control since 2007, with various minority administrations led by both Labour and the Scottish National Party (SNP) operating since then. Following the 2022 election the council is under no overall control, being led by an SNP minority administration. The next election is due in 2027.

Political control
The first election to North Ayrshire Council was held in 1995, initially operating as a shadow authority alongside the outgoing authorities until the new system came into force on 1 April 1996. Political control of the council since 1996 has been as follows:

Leadership
The leaders of the council since 1996 have been:

Elections
Since 2007 elections have been held every five years under the single transferable vote system, introduced by the Local Governance (Scotland) Act 2004. Election results since 1995 have been as follows:

Premises
The council is based at Cunnninghame House on Friars Croft in Irvine, which was built in 1975 as the headquarters for the Cunninghame District Council, forming part of the new town centre for Irvine following its designation as a New Town.

Wards
As of 2022, the council area is divided into nine multi-member wards returning 33 members, composed as follows:
Ardrossan (3 seats)
Arran (1 seat)
Garnock Valley (5 seats)
Irvine East (3 seats)
Irvine South (3 seats)
Irvine West (4 seats)
Kilwinning (4 seats)
North Coast (5 seats)
Saltcoats and Stevenston (5 seats)

Wider politics
At the House of Commons, North Ayrshire is covered by the Central Ayrshire and North Ayrshire and Arran Parliamentary constituencies, both of which are represented by MPs belonging to the Scottish National Party. In the Scottish Parliament, the council area is divided into Cunninghame North and Cunninghame South, both represented by MSPs from the Scottish National Party.

Towns and villages
The main administration centre and largest settlement in North Ayrshire is Irvine, a new town on the coast of the Firth of Clyde, with a population of 33,698.

The second biggest settlement is Kilwinning which has a population of over 18,000. Other major population centres include Largs, and the 'Three Towns' - Ardrossan, Saltcoats and Stevenston.

On the Isle of Arran, the largest village is Lamlash and there are numerous smaller villages.  On Great Cumbrae, the only town on the island is Millport.

Towns (mainland)

 Ardrossan
 Beith
 Dalry
 Irvine
 Kilbirnie
 Kilwinning
 Largs
 Saltcoats
 Stevenston
 West Kilbride

Villages (mainland)

 Ardeer
 Auchentiber
 Barrmill
 Benslie
 Dreghorn
 Drybridge
 Fairlie
 Gateside
 Girdle Toll
 Glengarnock
 Longbar
 Skelmorlie
 Springside
 Stanecastle

Suburbs (mainland)

 Barkip
 Broomlands
 Bourtreehill
 Burnhouse
 Castlepark
 Crosbie
 Chapeltoun
 Cunninghamhead
 Dalgarven
 Drakemyre
 Eglinton
 Fergushill
 Fullarton
 Giffordland
 Greenhills
 Hessilhead hamlet
 Highfield
 Hunterston
 Kelburn
 Lawthorn
 Lylestone
 Meigle
 Meikle Auchengree
 Montgreenan
 Nettlehirst
 Perceton
 Portencross
 Routenburn
 Seamill
 Sevenacres
 Shewalton
 Torranyard

Villages (Isle of Arran)
 
 Birchburn
 Blackwaterfoot
 Brodick
 Catacol
 Cladach
 Corrie
 Dippen
 Kildonan
 Kilmory
 Lagg
 Lamlash
 Lochranza
 Machrie
 Pirnmill
 Sannox
 Shiskine
 Sliddery
 Whitefarland
 Whiting Bay

Settlements (Great Cumbrae)

 Millport

Places of interest
Kelburn Castle
Barrmill Park
Clyde Muirshiel Regional Park
Eglinton Country Park, Irvine
Eglinton Tournament Bridge
Irvine Harbour
Spier's Old School Grounds

References

External links

 
Council areas of Scotland
Highlands and Islands of Scotland
Firth of Clyde